Harev (also known as Harey), was a Sasanian province in Late Antiquity, that lay within the kust of Khorasan. The province bordered Kushanshahr in the west, Abarshahr in the east, Marv in the north, and Sakastan in the south.

Name
The Middle Iranian name of Harev ( Harēw,  Harēw, Sogdian: Harēw) is derived from Old Persian  Haraiva.

History
Harev is first mentioned in Shapur I's inscription on the Ka'ba-ye Zartosht. It was also during his reign that the town Pushang was established near the capital of Harev, which had the same name as its province, and is today known as Herat. In ca. 430, a Christian community is mentioned in the capital.

The province played a key role in the boundless wars between the Sasanians and the Xionites and Hephthalites, a nomadic people who had settled in Transoxiana and Tokharistan in the late 4th-century. During the reign of Peroz I (r. 459–484), a group of Armenian nobles were settled in Harev by his foster brother Izad Gushnasp. In 484, Peroz I was defeated and killed by a Hephthalite army under Khushnavaz, who thereafter conquered Harev. The province remained in Hephthalite hands until Kavadh I (r. 488–496 & 498–531) reconquered the province during the early part of his second reign. During the reign of his son and successor Khosrow I (r. 531-579), the province became part of the kust of Khorasan.

In 588, during the reign of Hormizd IV (r. 579–590), Nestorian bishops from Harev went to the Sasanian capital Ctesiphon to be present at the synod of Ishoyahb I. In the same year, Harev was briefly occupied by the Göktürk ruler Bagha Qaghan (known as Sava/Saba in medieval Iranian sources). He was, however, defeated and killed by Hormizd IV's military commander Bahram Chobin. After the death of the last Sasanian king Yazdegerd III (r. 632–651) in 651, the province was annexed by the Hephthalite ruler of Badghis, Nezak Tarkhan. One year later, the province was conquered by the Arabs.

Coin minting
Harev served as a coin minting workshop; several gold and copper coins have been found in its capital, which are clearly from the Sasanian era. Although the Sasanians did not normally mint gold coins, Harev was an exception. The gold coins show a portrait of the ruler on one side, while a fire altar on the other. Some of the names of the governors on the coins has a close resemblance to the names of the Indo-Sasanians, which suggests that the Indo-Sasanian governor also had control over Harev at times.

See also
Aria (region)

References

Sources

 
 
 
 
 

Provinces of the Sasanian Empire
651 disestablishments